Haplogroup I-M253, also known as I1, is a Y chromosome haplogroup. The genetic markers confirmed as identifying I-M253 are the SNPs M253,M307.2/P203.2, M450/S109, P30, P40, L64, L75, L80, L81, L118, L121/S62, L123, L124/S64, L125/S65, L157.1, L186, and L187. It is a primary branch of Haplogroup I-M170 (I*).

Haplogroup I1 is believed to have been present among Upper Paleolithic European hunter-gatherers as a minor lineage but due to its near-total absence in pre-Neolithic DNA samples it cannot have been very widespread. Neolithic I1 samples are very sparse as well, suggesting a rapid dispersion connected to a founder effect in the Nordic Bronze Age. Today it reaches its peak frequencies in Sweden (52 percent of males in Västra Götaland County) and western Finland (more than 50 percent in Satakunta province). In terms of national averages, I-M253 is found in 38-39% of Swedish males, 37% of Norwegian males, 34.8% of Danish males, 34.5% of Icelandic males, and about 28% of Finnish males. Bryan Sykes, in his 2006 book Blood of the Isles, gives the members – and the notional founding patriarch of I1 the name "Wodan".

All known living members descend from a common ancestor 6 times younger than the common ancestor with I2.

Before a reclassification in 2008, the group was known as I1a, a name that has since been reassigned to a primary branch, haplogroup I-DF29. The other primary branches of I1 (M253) are I1b (S249/Z131) and I1c (Y18119/Z17925).

More than 99% of living men with I1 belong to the DF29 branch which is estimated to have emerged in 2400 BCE.  All DF29 men share a common ancestor born between 2500 and 2400 BCE.  The oldest ancient individual with I1-DF29 found is Oll009, a man from early Bronze Age Sweden.

Origins

While haplogroup I1 most likely diverged from I* as early as 27,000 years ago in the Gravettian, so far DNA studies have only been able to locate it in three Paleolithic and Mesolithic hunter-gatherers. As of November 2022, only 6 ancient DNA samples from human remains dating to earlier than the Nordic Bronze Age have been assigned to haplogroup I1:

 A hunter-gatherer from the Azilian in Spain in 11,466 BCE classified as having a now extinct branch of I-Z2699.
 Burial SF11 Date: 7500 BP - The first is a DNA sample from a Scandinavian hunter-gatherer with the label SF11 found on Stora Karlsö on Gotland. SF11 was found to have carried 9 of the 312 SNPs that define haplogroup I1. SF11 was classified as I1-Z2699*. SF11 was not assigned to a specific archaeological culture due to the skeleton being found in the Stora Förvar cave on Stora Karlsö.
 Burial BAB5 Date: 7300-5900 BP - The second is an individual sample from Balatonszemes-Bagodomb labelled BAB5, from Neolithic Hungary. BAB5 was found to have carried 1 of the 312 SNPs that define haplogroup I1. BAB5 may also be classified as I1-Z2699*. BAB5 had a genetic affinity to other contemporary Neolithic farmers of Central Europe.
 Burial RISE179 Date: 4010-3776 BP - Additionally, the third ancient I1 sample is from an individual found in a kurgan burial dating to the late Neolithic Dagger Period in Scandinavia labelled RISE179. The grave is located close to Abbekås on the south coast of Skåne  RISE179 had a genetic affinity to the populations of the Corded Ware culture and the Unetice culture.
 Burial oll009 Date: 3930-3750 BP - The fourth ancient I1 sample predating the Nordic Bronze Age (1700–500 BCE) is labelled oll009 and was sequenced in the study titled "The genomic ancestry of the Scandinavian Battle Axe Culture people and their relation to the broader Corded Ware horizon". Oll009 is dated to the Scandinavian late Neolithic and was found in a burial in Sweden close to Öllsjö on the east coast of Skåne.  Similar to RISE179, he carried a high percentage of Western Steppe-Herder ancestry and had a genetic affinity to the population of the Battle Axe culture and other populations of the Corded Ware horizon. oll009 has Y11204 but does not seem to have Y164553 or Y11205.

Despite the high frequency of haplogroup I1 in present-day Scandinavians, I1 is completely absent among early agriculturalist DNA samples from Neolithic Scandinavia (which also is the case with other haplogroups across Europe). Except for a single DNA sample (SF11), it is also absent from Mesolithic hunter-gatherers in Scandinavia. I1 first starts to appear in Scandinavia in notable frequency during the late Neolithic in conjunction with the entrance of groups carrying Western Steppe Herder ancestry into Scandinavia, but does not increase significantly in frequency until the beginning of the Nordic Bronze Age.

Due to the very low number of ancient DNA samples that have been assigned to I1 that date to earlier than the Nordic Bronze Age, it is currently unknown whether I1 was present as a rare haplogroup among Scandinavian forager cultures such as Pitted Ware before becoming assimilated by the Battle Axe culture, or if it was brought into Scandinavia by incoming groups such as Battle Axe who may have assimilated it from cultures such as the Funnelbeaker culture in Central Europe; or the steppe itself. Future research will most likely be able to determine which one of these two possible origins turns out to be the case.

Samples SF11 and BAB5 are unlike other ancient DNA samples assigned to I1 in the sense that they both seem to represent now-extinct branches of I1 that hadn't fully developed into I-M253 yet. They are therefore unlikely to have been ancestral to present-day carriers of I1, who all share a common ancestor that lived around 2600 BC.

According to a study published in 2010, I-M253 originated between 3,170 and 5,000 years ago, in Chalcolithic Europe. A new study in 2015 estimated the origin as between 3,470 and 5,070 years ago or between 3,180 and 3,760 years ago, using two different techniques.

In 2007, it was suggested that it initially dispersed from the area that is now Denmark.
However, Prof. Dr. Kenneth Nordtvedt, Montana State University, regarding the MRCA, in 2009 wrote in a personal message: "We don't know where that man existed, but the greater lower Elbe basin seems like the heartland of I1".

Latest results (January 2022) published by Y-Full suggest I1 (I-M253) was formed 27,500 ybp (95 CI: 29,800 ybp – 25,200 ybp) with TMRCA 4,600 ybp (95 CI: 5,200 ybp – 4,000 ybp). Since the most up-to date calculated estimation of TMRCA of I1 is thought to be around 2600 BC, this likely puts the ancestor of all living I1 men somewhere in Northern Europe around that time. The phylogeny of I1 shows the signature of a rapid star-like expansion. This suggests that I1 went from being a rare marker to a rather common one in a rapid burst.

Structure 
I-M253  (M253, M307.2/P203.2, M450/S109, P30, P40, L64, L75, L80, L81, L118, L121/S62, L123, L124/S64, L125/S65, L157.1, L186, and L187) or I1 
 I-DF29 (DF29/S438); I1a
 I-CTS6364 (CTS6364/Z2336); I1a1
 FGC20030; I1a1a~
 S4767; I1a1a1~
 I-M227; I1a1a1a1a
 A394; I1a1a2~
 Y11221; I1a1a3~
 A5338; I1a1a4~
 CTS10028; I1a1b
 I-L22 (L22/S142); I1a1b1
 CTS11651/Z2338; I1a1b1a~
 I-P109; I1a1b1a1
 I-Y3662; I1a1b1a1e~
 I-S14887; I1a1b1a1e2~
 I-Y11203; I1a1b1a1e2d~
 I-Y29630; I1a1b1a1e2d2~
 CTS6017; I1a1b1a2
 I-L205 (L205.1/L939.1/S239.1); I1a1b1a3
 CTS6868; I1a1b1a4
 I-Z74; I1a1b1a4a
 CTS2208; I1a1b1a4a1~
 I-L287; I1a1b1a4a1a
 I-L258 (L258/S335); I1a1b1a4a1a1
 I-L813; I1a1b1a4a2
 FGC12562; I1a1b1a4a3~
 CTS11603/S4744; I1a1b1b~
 I-FT40464
 I-Y19934 
 I-L300 (L300/S241); I1a1b1b1a1
 I-Y19933
 I-Y19932
 I-Y22015
 I-FT57000 
 FGC10477/Y13056; I1a1b2
 A8178, A8182, A8200, A8204; I1a1b3~
 F13534.2/Y17263.2; I1a1b4~

 I-Z58 (S244/Z58); I1a2
 I-Z59 (S246/Z59); I1a2a
 I-Z60 (S337/Z60, S439/Z61, Z62); I1a2a1
 I-Z140 (Z140, Z141)
 I-L338
 I-F2642 (F2642)
 I-Z73
 I-L1302
 I-L573
 I-L803
 I-Z382; I1a2a2
 I-Z138 (S296/Z138, Z139); I1a2b
 I-Z2541
I-Z63 (S243/Z63); I1a3
 I-BY151; I1a3a
 I-L849.2; I1a3a1
 I-BY351; I1a3a2
 I-CTS10345
 I-Y10994
 I-Y7075
 I-S2078
 I-S2077
 I-Y2245 (Y2245/PR683)
 I-L1237
 I-FGC9550
 I-S10360
 I-S15301
 I-Y7234
 I-BY62 (BY62); I1a3a3

 I-Z131 (Z131/S249); I1b
 I-CTS6397; I1b1
 I-Z17943 (Y18119/Z17925, S2304/Z17937); I1c

Historical expansion 

Haplogroup I1, as well as subclades of R1b such as R1b-U106 and subclades of R1a such as R1a-Z284, are strongly associated with Germanic peoples and are linked to the proto-Germanic speakers of the Nordic Bronze Age. Current DNA research indicates that I1 was close to non-existent in most of Europe outside of Scandinavia and northern Germany before the Migration Period. The expansion of I1 is directly tied to that of the Germanic tribes. Starting around 900 BC, Germanic tribes started moving out of southern Scandinavia and northern Germany into the nearby lands between the Elbe and the Oder. Between 600 and 300 BC another wave of Germanics migrated across the Baltic Sea and settled alongside the Vistula. Germanic migration to that area resulted in the formation of the Wielbark culture, which is associated with the Goths.

I1-Z63 has been traced to the Kowalewko burial site in Poland which dates to the Roman Iron Age. In 2017 Polish researchers could successfully assign YDNA haplogroups to 16 individuals who were buried at the site. Out of these 16 individuals, 8 belonged to I1. In terms of subclades, three belonged to I-Z63, and in particular subclade I-L1237. The Kowalewko archeological site has been associated with the Wielbark culture. Therefore the subclade I-L1237 of I-Z63 may be seen somewhat as a genetic indicator of the Gothic tribe of late antiquity. I1-Z63 has also been found in a burial associated with Goth and Lombard remains in Collegno, Italy. The cemetery is dated to the late 6th Century and further suggests that I1-Z63 and downstream subclades are linked to early Medieval Gothic migrations.

In 2015, a DNA study tested the Y-DNA haplogroups of 12 samples dated to 300-400 AD from Saxony-Anhalt in Germany. 8 of them belonged to haplogroup I1. This DNA evidence is in alignment with the historical migrations of Germanic tribes from Scandinavia to central Europe.

Additionally, I1-Z63 was found in the Late Antiquity site Crypta Balbi in Rome, this time with the downstream subclade I-Y7234. Material findings associated with the Lombards have been excavated in Crypta Balbi.

The Pla de l'Horta villa near Girona in Spain is located in close proximity to a necropolis with a series of tombs associated with the Visigoths. The grave goods and the typology of the tombs point to a Visigothic origin of the individuals. A small number of individuals buried at the site were sampled for DNA analysis in a 2019 study. One of the samples belonged to haplogroup I1. This finding is in accordance with the common ancestral origin of the Visigoths and the Ostrogoths.

The Anglo-Saxon settlement of Britain introduced I1 in the British Isles.

During the Viking Age, I-M253 saw another expansion. Margaryan et al. 2020 analyzed 442 Viking world individuals from various archaeological sites in Europe. I-M253 was the most common Y-haplogroup found in the study. Norwegian and Danish Vikings brought more I1 to Britain and Ireland, while Swedish Vikings introduced it to Russia and Ukraine and brought more of it to Finland and Estonia.

Geographical distribution 
I-M253 is found at its highest density in Northern Europe and other countries that experienced extensive migration from Northern Europe, either in the Migration Period, the Viking Age,  or modern times.  It is found in all places invaded by the Norse.

During the modern era, significant I-M253 populations have also taken root in immigrant nations and former European colonies such as the United States, Australia, New Zealand and Canada.

In 2002 a paper was published by Michael E. Weale and colleagues showing genetic evidence for population differences between the English and Welsh populations, including a markedly higher level of Y-DNA haplogroup I1 in England than in Wales. They saw this as convincing evidence of Anglo-Saxon mass invasion of eastern Great Britain from northern Germany and Denmark during the Migration Period. The authors assumed that populations with large proportions of haplogroup I1 originated from northern Germany or southern Scandinavia, particularly Denmark, and that their ancestors had migrated across the North Sea with Anglo-Saxon migrations and Danish Vikings. The main claim by the researchers was

that an Anglo-Saxon immigration event affecting 50–100% of the Central English male gene pool at that time is required. We note, however, that our data do not allow us to distinguish an event that simply added to the indigenous Central English male gene pool from one where indigenous males were displaced elsewhere or one where indigenous males were reduced in number ... This study shows that the Welsh border was more of a genetic barrier to Anglo-Saxon Y chromosome gene flow than the North Sea ... These results indicate that a political boundary can be more important than a geophysical one in population genetic structuring.

In 2003 a paper was published by Christian Capelli and colleagues which supported, but modified, the conclusions of Weale and colleagues. This paper, which sampled Great Britain and Ireland on a grid, found a smaller difference between Welsh and English samples, with a gradual decrease in Haplogroup I1 frequency moving westwards in southern Great Britain. The results suggested to the authors that Norwegian Vikings invaders had heavily influenced the northern area of the British Isles, but that both English and mainland Scottish samples all have German/Danish influence.

Prominent members of I-M253 

Alexander Hamilton, through genealogy and the testing of his descendants (assuming actual paternity matching his genealogy), has been placed within Y-DNA haplogroup I-M253.

The Varangian Šimon, who was said to have been the founder of the Russian Vorontsov noble family, belonged to haplogroup I1-Y15024. Testing by geneticist Peter Sjölund and FamilyTreeDNA showed that the present-day male members of the Vorontsov family still carry this subclade of I1, and downstream subclades. Other historical members of the Vorontsov family were Prince Mikhail Semyonovich Vorontsov and Illarion Ivanovich Vorontsov-Dashkov.

The Rurikid Prince Sviatopolk the Accursed (son of Vladimir the Great) was found to likely have carried the I1-S2077 subclade of I1-Z63.

Birger Jarl, 'Duke of Sweden' of the East Geatish House of Bjälbo, founder of Stockholm; his remains were exhumed and tested in 2002 and found to be I-M253. The House of Bjälbo also provided three kings of Norway, and one king of Denmark in the 14th century.

Sting was revealed to belong to haplogroup I1 by the PBS TV series Finding Your Roots.

William Bradford (governor) of the Mayflower, proven through the Mayflower DNA Project

William Brewster (Mayflower passenger) of the Mayflower, proven through the Mayflower DNA Project

General Robert E. Lee belonged to I-M253 based on DNA testing of his descendants as a part of the Lee DNA Project. Other prominent members of the Lee family of Virginia and Maryland were Richard Lee I and Richard Henry Lee.

Robert I of Scotland, commonly known as Robert the Bruce, belonged to haplogroup I1. Descendant testing of Robert, 6th lord of Annandale de Brus, assigned the men of Clan Bruce to I1-Y17395.

The male members of the House of Grimaldi were revealed to carry haplogroup I1 as a part of the Grimaldi Genealogy DNA project. The men of House Grimaldi belong to a Scandinavian subclade of I1, downstream of I1-Y3549.

President Andrew Jackson belonged to haplogroup I1, based on results from the Jackson DNA project and from genealogy.

The Russian writer Leo Tolstoy was found to have carried I1. The testing of his male descendant Pyotr Tolstoy revealed that the males of the Tolstoy family carry I1-M253.

Snorri Sturluson was found to likely have belonged to haplogroup I1. Y-DNA testing of his presumed descendants revealed an assignment to I-M253. Their results are available on YSearch.org.

The Swedish scientist and theologian Emanuel Swedenborg and other male members of the Swedenborg noble family were found to belong to haplogroup I1-BY229, as a part of the I1-L1302 DNA project by Jakob Norstedt.

Siener van Rensburg, Boer patriotic figure and mystic, belonged to haplogroup I1.

Björn Wahlroos, Finnish businessman and millionaire, was found to belong to haplogroup I1.

The Finnish mathematician Rolf Nevanlinna belonged to I1-M253 based on the testing of his son Arne Nevanlinna by Geni.com.

Samuel Morse was found to have carried haplogroup I1 as a part of the Morse DNA project.

Footballers Sebastian Larsson and his father Svante Larsson were found to belong to I1-Y24470 through the testing of a family member.

Felix Kjellberg (PewDiePie) was found to belong to haplogroup I1-L22, according to testing by 23andMe.

Swedish actor Björn Andrésen belongs to haplogroup I1-L22 based on the ftDNA and 23andMe tests of one of his first cousins and one uncle on the paternal side as a part of their family research. Their ancestor Johan Andrésen lived on both sides of the Swedish-Norwegian border.

As a part of the Pine family DNA project, actor Chris Pine was found to belong to haplogroup I1-A13819.

Ice hockey defenceman Börje Salming was found to carry I1-M253. On episode 6 of the first season of the Carina Bergfeldt show on Swedish television, geneticist Peter Sjölund helped Salming investigate his DNA to find out more about his Sámi roots.

Markers

The following are the technical specifications for known I-M253 haplogroup SNP and STR mutations.

Name: M253
Type: SNP
Source: M (Peter Underhill of Stanford University)
Position: ChrY:13532101..13532101 (+ strand)
Position (base pair): 283
Total size (base pairs): 400
Length: 1
ISOGG HG: I1
Primer F (Forward 5′→ 3′): GCAACAATGAGGGTTTTTTTG
Primer R (Reverse 5′→ 3′): CAGCTCCACCTCTATGCAGTTT
YCC HG: I1
Nucleotide alleles change (mutation): C to T

Name: M307
Type: SNP
Source: M (Peter Underhill)
Position: ChrY:21160339..21160339 (+ strand)
Length: 1
ISOGG HG: I1
Primer F: TTATTGGCATTTCAGGAAGTG
Primer R: GGGTGAGGCAGGAAAATAGC
YCC HG: I1
Nucleotide alleles change (mutation): G to A

Name: P30
Type: SNP
Source: PS (Michael Hammer of the University of Arizona and James F. Wilson, at the University of Edinburgh)
Position: ChrY:13006761..13006761 (+ strand)
Length: 1
ISOGG HG: I1
Primer F: GGTGGGCTGTTTGAAAAAGA
Primer R: AGCCAAATACCAGTCGTCAC
YCC HG: I1
Nucleotide alleles change (mutation): G to A
Region:     ARSDP

Name: P40
Type: SNP
Source: PS (Michael Hammer and James F. Wilson)
Position: ChrY:12994402..12994402 (+ strand)
Length: 1
ISOGG HG: I1
Primer F: GGAGAAAAGGTGAGAAACC
Primer R: GGACAAGGGGCAGATT
YCC HG: I1
Nucleotide alleles change (mutation): C to T
Region: ARSDP

See also 

 European ethnic groups
 Genetic history of Europe
 Germanic peoples
 History of Normandy
 Human Y-chromosome DNA haplogroups
 Late Glacial Maximum
 Neolithic Europe
 Norse colonization of the Americas
 Norse Sagas

References

Further reading

External links 
Haplogroup I databases
 Haplogroup I1 Project at FTDNA
 Danish Demes Regional DNA Project at FTDNA
 Haplogroup I-P109 Project
 British Isles DNA Project

General Y-DNA databases
There are several public access databases featuring I-M253, including:
 http://www.ysearch.org/ 
 http://www.yhrd.org/
 http://www.yfull.com/tree/I1/

I-M253
Nordic Stone Age
Stone Age Europe